Suitable for Framing is the second studio album by American rock band Three Dog Night. The album was released on the Dunhill record label on June 11, 1969 and was the first of two albums released by the band that year (see 1969 in music).

The album contains the top 20 hit singles "Easy to Be Hard", "Eli's Coming", and "Celebrate"; the latter of which (along with the album's opening track "Feelin' Alright") featured the Chicago horn section. It is also notable for being the first album by Three Dog Night to include songs written by band members, and for its inclusion of the Elton John / Bernie Taupin song "Lady Samantha," as the duo of John/Taupin would not become widely known in the United States for another year.

The album reached the top 10 on charts in both The United States and Canada and became certified gold by the RIAA at the end of the year.

Recording, production, artwork, packaging 
As with the band's self-titled debut album, Suitable for Framing was recorded at American Recording Company, was produced by Gabriel Mekler (who produced other Dunhill artists including Steppenwolf), and was engineered by Richard Podolor (who would later become the group's producer) and Bill Cooper. The band members during the album's recording were Danny Hutton (vocals), Chuck Negron (vocals), Cory Wells (vocals), Jimmy Greenspoon (keyboards), Michael Allsup (guitars), Joe Schermie (bass), and Floyd Sneed (drums, percussion). Engineer Richard Podolor also performed as an uncredited guitarist on the album.

The original version of Suitable for Framing (Dunhill DS 50058) was released as a vinyl LP record with a gatefold sleeve. The art direction for the original LP sleeve was done by Wayne Kimbell with photography by Ed Caraeff.  The album's gatefold photo features Three Dog Night wearing greasepaint make-up, and posing with members of the Los Angeles groupie troupe The GTOs.

Critical reception 
Writing for The New York Times in 1969, Robert Christgau believed Suitable for Framing suffered for the same reasons Three Dog Night succeeded:

Track listing

Side one
"Feelin' Alright" (Dave Mason) – 3:39
 Lead vocals shared by Hutton, Negron and Wells; includes the Chicago horn section.
"Lady Samantha" (Elton John, Bernie Taupin) – 2:53
 Lead vocal: Negron.
"Dreaming Isn't Good for You" (Danny Hutton) – 2:16
 Lead vocal: Hutton.
"A Change Is Gonna Come" (Sam Cooke) – 3:10
 Lead vocal: Wells.
"Eli's Coming" (Laura Nyro) – 2:41
 Lead vocal: Wells. Does not include the piano outro used in the 45 RPM mono mix of the song.

Side two
"Easy to Be Hard" (Galt MacDermot, James Rado, Gerome Ragni) – 3:11
 Lead vocal: Negron.  Features an uncredited string section.
"Ain't That a Lotta Love" (Willie Dean "Deanie" Parker, Homer Banks) – 2:16
 Lead vocal: Wells.
"King Solomon's Mines" (Floyd Sneed) – 2:29
 Instrumental, dominated by percussion tracks performed by Sneed.
"Circle for a Landing" (Don Preston) – 2:20
 Lead vocal: Hutton.
"Celebrate" (Gary Bonner, Alan Gordon) – 3:13
 Lead vocals shared by Hutton, Negron and Wells; includes the Chicago horn section.

Personnel
The following people contributed to Suitable for Framing:
Cory Wells – lead vocals (tracks A1, A4-A5, B2, B5), background vocals 
Chuck Negron – lead vocals (tracks A1-A2, B1, B5), background vocals
Danny Hutton – lead vocals (tracks A1, A3, B4-B5), background vocals
Mike Allsup – guitar
Joe Schermie – bass
Floyd Sneed – drums, percussion
Jimmy Greenspoon – keyboards
Walter Parazaider – saxophone on "Celebrate" and "Feelin' Alright"
Lee Loughnane – trumpet on "Celebrate" and "Feelin' Alright"
James Pankow – trombone on "Celebrate" and "Feelin' Alright"
Gabriel Mekler – producer 
Richard Podolor – guitar (uncredited), engineer
Bill Cooper – engineer

Charts

Weekly charts

Singles

Certifications

References 

Three Dog Night albums
1969 albums
Albums produced by Gabriel Mekler
Dunhill Records albums
Stateside Records albums
MCA Records albums